Bernard Fernandez (16 March 1924 – 6 December 2000) was a French racing cyclist. He rode in the 1950 Tour de France.

References

1924 births
2000 deaths
French male cyclists
Place of birth missing